The President of Ambazonia is the head of state of the Federal Republic of Ambazonia, unrecognised breakaway state in West Africa constituting the Northwest Region and Southwest Region of Cameroon, part of the British mandate territory historically known as the Southern Cameroons. No country has yet formally recognized Ambazonia's independence. Ambazonia is currently the site of an armed conflict between separatist guerillas and the Cameroonian military, known as the Anglophone Crisis. For its whole existence, the Presidency of Ambazonia has been a position in exile, as the various pro-independence armed groups have not consistently controlled any territory but are engaged in guerilla campaigns throughout the 16,364 square mile territory.

History

On October 1, 2017, Sisiku Julius Ayuk Tabe, the appointed chairman of the Southern Cameroons Ambazonia Consortium United Front (SCACUF), declared the independence of Ambazonia with himself as president and SCACUF forming the Ambazonia Interim Government. His presidency de facto ended on January 5, 2018, when him and other members of the Ambazonia Interim Government were arrested in Abuja, Nigeria, and extradited to Cameroon on January 26.  He has been imprisoned by the Cameroonian government ever since.  

Following Tabe's arrest, on February 4, 2018, Samuel Ikome Sako was elected acting interim president by an electoral college comprising the remaining Ayuk Tabe cabinet and representatives from the diaspora. On May 2, 2019 and while under detention, a document signed by Ayuk Tabe declared that the Sako-led interim cabinet had been dissolved, and that his own pre-arrest cabinet had been restored. This move was not recognized by the Sako-led cabinet, which refused to step down, arguing that a leader in detention has no mandate to unseat the elected replacement.

In February 2022, Sako ordered the suspension of the Restoration Council, the legislative arm of the Interim Government. The Restoration Council subsequently impeached Sako, thus widening the long-running Ambazonian leadership crisis. Meeting in Washington DC, 10-13 March 2022, the second Ambazonian Stakeholders Strategic Conference upgraded the Restoration Council to an Interim House of Representatives elected from the 13 counties of Ambazonia and reaffirmed support of Sako as President of Ambazonia. Meanwhile, the Restoration Council, declared Marianta Njomia as Sako's replacement.

On September 10 2022, long-term IG spokesperson Chris Anu (brother of deceased separatist general Lekeaka Oliver and former Sako loyalist) declared himself President of Ambazonia. Consequently, the separatist movement found itself with four claimants for president.

List

See also
Anglophone Crisis

Notes

References

Politics of Ambazonia
Presidents by country
Heads of state in Africa